Parliamentary elections were held in the Republic of Upper Volta on 7 November 1965. The country had been a one-party state since 1960, with the Voltaic Democratic Union–African Democratic Rally as the sole legal party. It therefore won all 75 seats in the National Assembly. Voter turnout was 97.4%.

Results

References

Elections in Burkina Faso
Burkina Faso
Parliamentary election
One-party elections